Ayurá is the 17th station on line A of the Medellín Metro going south. It is the first stop on line A that is outside the city limits of Medellín, being in the city of Envigado instead. The Carrefour in Envigado is near this stop, on Las Vegas Avenue. The station was opened on 30 September 1996 as part of the extension of the line from Poblado to Itagüí.

References

External links
 Official site of Medellín Metro 

Medellín Metro stations
Railway stations opened in 1996
1996 establishments in Colombia